The Tajikistan National Museum of Antiquities (Osorhona-i milli-i bostonšinosi-i Tojikiston; , Nacional'nyj muzej drevnostej Tadžikistana) is a museum in Dushanbe, Tajikistan. It is particularly famous for its murals from Penjikent.

Artifacts

References

Museums established in 1934
Dushanbe